Bulthaup (legally: Bulthaup GmbH & Co. KG, stylized as bulthaup) is a German kitchen manufacturer headquartered in Aich, Bodenkirchen, close to Landshut in Lower Bavaria. It has a headcount of 530, and records revenues of around 120 million euros – 80% of which is account for by exports.

Corporate history

Early years 
 
 
In 1949, Martin Bulthaup, originally from the East Westphalia area of Germany, founded the company Martin Bulthaup Möbelfabrik (German for Martin Bulthaup furniture factory) in Bodenkirchen, close to Landshut. Two years later, in 1951, he began manufacturing kitchen furniture. His first product was a sideboard with hand-sewn curtains.
In 1963, Martin Bulthaup built a factory in Bodenkirchen, followed by a further production facility in Neumarkt-Sankt Veit in 1966. At both sites, he introduced assembly lines.

In 1969, Bulthaup launched its Stil 75 product range.

By the late 1960s, the company was one of the top five German kitchen manufacturers with a revenue of 100 million Deutsche Marks. From 1973 onwards, it began exporting its products to members of the then European Economic Community.

In 1974, Bulthaup introduced its Concept 12, or c12, model. It enabled flexible kitchen designs, based on a 12 × 12 cm grid.

Following Martin Bulthaup's death in 1978, his son Gerd Bulthaup took on the reins of the company. He built a new production facility in Aich, uniting various business departments and corporate functions. Gerd, in seeking to expand the business, came into contact with the designer Otl Aicher, whose design ideas were largely based on the principles of the Ulm School of Design which favours simplified forms and functionality.

Collaboration with Otl Aicher 
1980 marked the beginning of Bulthaup’s collaboration with designer Otl Aicher. It was Aicher’s belief that the kitchen should be an inviting place where meals are prepared together; where all the required tools and implements are clearly visible, and stored within easy reach. In 1982, Aicher published his book Die Küche zum Kochen (The Kitchen is for Cooking).

This same year Bulthaup launched its System b kitchens, inspired by Aicher’s research. In 1988, the Bulthaup Kitchen Workbench (KWB) followed, combining a stainless steel cooktop, sink and worktop. The workbench brought design elements typical of professional kitchens into the private setting, and went on to win multiple awards.

1990s 
 
 
1992 was the year of Bulthaup’s System 25. Its modular structure and diverse components enabled flexible kitchen design. The name System 25 was derived from the 3D 25 × 25 × 25 mm grid the range was based on. System 25’s broad range of fronts and surface materials allowed each part of the kitchen to be carefully planned according to its purpose. Items that needed to be particularly hard-wearing could be produced using stainless steel, combined with glass, wood, or laminate surfaces. The new Bulthaup extractor, whose form and function were based on those used in professional kitchens, won several awards. During this period, Bulthaup also developed and launched Korpus and Duktus seating.

In 1997, Bulthaup launched the mobile System 20, with its wheeled containers and freely positionable elements. Each item could be combined as the customer wished and placed anywhere in the room where there was an electricity and water supply.

From 2000 
In 2002, Gerd Bulthaup retired from the day-to-day running of the business. The company went on to be headed up by several external managers before returning to the family in 2010, under the leadership of Marc O. Eckert.

In 2004, the materials and adhesives that Bulthaup used to produce its kitchens were tested by the German consumer magazine Öko-Test (eco-test) – verifying that they were not harmful to health. Both Bulthaup and fellow manufacturers Poggenpohl were categorized as “satisfactory”.

Product ranges 
Currently, Bulthaup offers three product ranges: b1, b2 and b3.

Bulthaup b1 
b1 takes a purist approach to the kitchen. The doors and pull-outs can all be opened without handles. The lower prices attract a younger target audience. In comparison to the b3 range, there is also a reduced number of options for surfaces, worktops and units.

Bulthaup b2 
The b2 range is a continuation of Otl Aicher’s “kitchen workshop”. It comprises two cabinets housing everything from dishes to a refrigerator, dishwasher and oven. Each item is immediately accessible as soon as the doors are opened. A workbench incorporates the water point and cooktop. And the interior of the cabinets and the workbench both have a modular design.

Bulthaup b3 
One of the defining elements of the b3 range is the multi-function wall installed in front of the actual wall, for hanging kitchen utensils, cabinets, and other elements. These can be freely positioned according to the requirements of the specific room. The result is a kitchen that appears to float. But the multi-function wall does not only support kitchen tools and cabinets. Knife blocks, kitchen roll holders and shelves can also be hung from its grooves. In addition, function boxes with hinged openings provide additional storage space, keeping all utensils, food, and herbs and spices close to hand.

Kitchen furniture and fittings 
Other Bulthaup brand products include tables, benches, extractors, faucets, lighting and other accessories designed for private kitchens.

Design characteristics 
The Bulthaup brand is known for its functional, ergonomic designs. One key element is a table, originally made from wood, positioned in the center of the kitchen. This butcher’s block was the first in a series of free-standing products that enabled people to cook together, and communicate with each other. It was followed by the Bulthaup kitchen workbench, made entirely of stainless steel. Thanks to the ergonomic design of the Bulthaup faucet, the volume and temperature of the water and the position of the water point itself can be easily adjusted with just one hand. 
The b3 system of interior elements is another hallmark of the Bulthaup brand. The inserts in the b3 pull-outs are wave-like in form, and accommodate moveable dividers for customizable compartment sizes.

Sales structure 
 
Bulthaup kitchens are only sold in Bulthaup showrooms and by authorized retailers. For many years, the company has focused on presenting and selling its kitchens in single-brand stores.

Today, Bulthaup collaborates with around 500 retail partners worldwide, who all operate their showrooms as independent businesses. Bulthaup also has subsidiaries in the UK, France, Italy, Spain, the Netherlands, Switzerland, Hong Kong, and the United States.

Awards 
2014: The German Design Council presents Gerd Bulthaup with the German Design Award in the Personality category. This is an annual prize bestowed on people who have made a significant contribution to the design industry.

2014: German magazine WirtschaftsWoche ranks Bulthaup in fifth place of 30 luxury brands, making it once again the top furniture maker.

2014: Bulthaup receives the Gold Architects Partner Award from AIT magazine. This accolade is given to companies that set a strong example in their collaboration with architects and demonstrate exceptional sales skills.

2013: The Bulthaup b3 system of interior elements wins the Chicago Athenaeum Museum of Architecture and Design’s Good Design Award for Kitchen/Utensils.

2013: The Bulthaup b3 system of interior elements receives the Wallpaper Design Award in the Best Storage category.

2010: The b2 system wins the Design Award of the Federal Republic of Germany.

2007: German magazine WirtschaftsWoche rates Bulthaup as the No.1 furniture maker in its ranking of luxury brands.

1997: The European Commission presents Bulthaup with a Lifetime Achievement Award and the European Design Prize.

References
For greater replicability all references have been transferred from German to English.

External links

(English) Bulthaup GmbH & Co. KG English corporate homepage
(International) Bulthaup GmbH & Co. KG International corporate homepage
Ward, Timothy Jack: CURRENTS: SHOWROOM; Kitchen Designs Where Nothing Is Wasted. The New York Times, November 11, 1999.

Kitchen manufacturers
Manufacturing companies established in 1949
Furniture companies of Germany
Manufacturing companies of Germany